Ed Mann is a musician who has been "a drummer and piano dabbler since childhood." He is best known for his mallet percussion performances onstage with Frank Zappa's ensemble from 1977 to 1988, and his appearances on over 30 of Zappa's albums, both studio recordings and with Zappa's band live.  Mann also has released a number of CDs as a bandleader and composer.

Career 

Mann formed a band with Tommy Mars in mid 1973. By the end of that year he was studying with John Bergamo at CalArts. In 1977 Frank Zappa asked Bergamo to do some overdubbing on the Zappa In New York album and Bergamo in turn recommended Mann.

A few months later Ruth Underwood told Mann that Zappa was looking for a second keyboard player. When Mann called to recommend Tommy Mars ("At midnight, the only time when you could reach Frank by phone"), Zappa invited him to come to his house. Mann went to the house, where Terry Bozzio, Patrick O'Hearn, and Adrian Belew were jamming with Zappa. By 2:00am Ed was in the band. Mann later commented: "It took a few days for that all to sink in."

Mann can be heard playing gongs on J21's Yellow Mind:Blue Mind album.

Until mid-2014 Mann was a member of The Band From Utopia which has featured many Zappa alumni such as Robert Martin, Chad Wackerman, Albert Wing, Tom Fowler, Ray White and Ralph Humphrey over the years. In 2008, Ed Mann toured with Project Object and sat in with Agent Moosehead at the New York Harvest Festival and Freedom Rally. In 2013 Mann began performing on percussion and electronics with The Z3, an organ, guitar and drums trio that adapts Zappa music to the Hammond organ-centered jazz-funk tradition. Mann played on The White Album and did a virtuoso performance on the song 'Apple A Day.'  Mann played on two of David Arvedon's albums.

Mann joined Northeast blugrasstafarian jamband Desert Rain for their set at the Wormtown Music Festival in the fall of 2015.  Since then he has been joining the group at clubs throughout the Northeast.

In July 2016 Mann joined Mike Dillon for three dates of Dillon's northeast US tour.

Discography with Zappa 

 Zappa in New York (Frank Zappa, 1978)
 Sheik Yerbouti (Frank Zappa, 1979)
 Joe's Garage Act I (Zappa, 1979)
 Joe's Garage Acts II & III (Zappa, 1979)
 Tinseltown Rebellion (Frank Zappa, 1981)
 Shut Up 'N Play Yer Guitar (Zappa, 1981)
 You Are What You Is (Zappa, 1981)
 Ship Arriving Too Late to Save a Drowning Witch (Zappa, 1982)
 The Man From Utopia (Zappa, 1983)
 Baby Snakes (Frank Zappa, 1983)
 London Symphony Orchestra, Vol. 1 (Zappa, 1983)
 Them or Us (Zappa, 1984)
 Thing-Fish (Zappa, 1984)
 Frank Zappa Meets the Mothers of Prevention (Frank Zappa, 1985)
 Jazz from Hell (Frank Zappa, 1986)
 London Symphony Orchestra, Vol. 2 (Zappa, 1987)
 Guitar (Frank Zappa, 1988)
 You Can't Do That on Stage Anymore, Vol. 1 (Zappa, 1988)
 Broadway the Hard Way (Frank Zappa)
 You Can't Do That on Stage Anymore, Vol. 3 (Zappa, 1989)
 The Best Band You Never Heard in Your Life (Frank Zappa, 1991)
 Make a Jazz Noise Here (Frank Zappa, 1991)
 You Can't Do That on Stage Anymore, Vol. 4 (Zappa, 1991)
 You Can't Do That on Stage Anymore, Vol. 5 (Zappa, 1992)
 You Can't Do That on Stage Anymore, Vol. 6 (Zappa, 1992)
 Frank Zappa Plays the Music of Frank Zappa: A Memorial Tribute (Frank Zappa, 1996)
 Halloween (Frank Zappa – Audio DVD, 2003)
 QuAUDIOPHILIAc (Zappa – kvadrofon Audio DVD, 2004)
 Trance-Fusion (Zappa Records 2006)
 The Dub Room Special (CD, Zappa Records, 2007)
 One Shot Deal (Zappa Records ZR 20006, 2008)
 Hammersmith Odeon (album) (Zappa, 2010)

Mann performances can be seen in the Zappa films Baby Snakes, Dub Room Special & Video From Hell.

Solo discography
 Get Up (1988)
 Perfect World (1991)
 Global Warming (1994)
 Have No Fear (1997)
 (((GONG))) Sound Of Being (1998)

References

Sources

Ed Mann Discography of CDs  at cduniverse.com
Perfect World Cutout at amazon.com

Living people
American rock drummers
American rock keyboardists
American people of German descent
1954 births
Place of birth missing (living people)
20th-century American drummers
American male drummers
20th-century American male musicians